Hot Line (US title: The Day the Hot Line Got Hot,  or ) is a 1967 French/Spanish international co-production comedy spy thriller directed by Etienne Périer and starring Robert Taylor in his final feature film and Charles Boyer. It was released in the US by American International Pictures.

Plot
An American and Russian agent find themselves duped by a double agent who works for both of them. Also involved are a naive IBM computer operator and the telephone operator at the hot-line center in Stockholm.

Cast
 Charles Boyer as Vostov, KGB head
 Robert Taylor as Anderson, CIA chief
 George Chakiris as Eric Ericson, Computer Expert with IBM 
 Marie Dubois as Natasha 
 Gérard Tichy as Truman 
 Marta Grau as Old Lady 
 Irene D'Astrea as Old Lady 
 Josefina Tapias as Old Lady 
 Maurice de Canonge as  Director of Hotel 
 Gustavo Re as Police Chief
 Ilya Salkind as himself

Bibliography

References

External links
 
 
 

1978 films
1960s spy comedy films
Films directed by Étienne Périer
French spy comedy films
American International Pictures films
English-language French films
Films about telephony
1967 comedy films
1967 films
1970s English-language films
1960s English-language films
1960s French films
1970s French films